The 1991 Basildon District Council election took place on 2 May 1991 to elect members of Basildon District Council in Essex, England. This was on the same day as other local elections. One third of the council was up for election; the seats which were last contested in 1987. An addition seat was up for election in Fryerns Central ward. The Labour Party lost control of the council, which it had gained only the previous year; the council fell back under no overall control.

Overall results

|-
| colspan=2 style="text-align: right; margin-right: 1em" | Total
| style="text-align: right;" | 15
| colspan=5 |
| style="text-align: right;" | 55,077
| style="text-align: right;" |

All comparisons in vote share are to the corresponding 1987 election.

Ward results

Billericay East

Billericay West

Burstead

Fryerns Central (2 seats)

Fryerns East

Laindon

Langdon Hills

Lee Chapel North

Nethermayne

Pitsea East

Pitsea West

Vange

Wickford North

Wickford South

References

1991
1991 English local elections
1990s in Essex